Tunisian may refer to:

 Someone or something connected to Tunisia
Tunisian Arabic
Tunisian people
Tunisian cuisine
 Tunisian culture

Language and nationality disambiguation pages